Grünau is a settlement in the ǁKaras Region of southern Namibia, west of Karasburg. It is linked to the South African border posts near Noordoewer via the B1 and Nakop via the B3. Grünau belongs to the Karasburg electoral constituency.

References

Populated places in the ǁKaras Region